
The Berne Convention (formally, the International Convention respecting the Prohibition of the Use of White (Yellow) Phosphorus in the Manufacture of Matches) of 1906 is a multilateral treaty negotiated in Berne, Switzerland, which prohibits the use of white phosphorus in the manufacture of matches. The treaty also prohibits the import and sale of such matches.

The background to the treaty was the extensive medical problems such as phossy jaw facing workers in match production. The treaty was concluded on 26 September 1906. It entered into force on 1 January 1912. The Convention remains in force for 48 states. Switzerland is the depositary for the treaty.

In 1925 Edward J. Phelan, future Director General of the International Labour Organization, stated that the establishment of the ILO "may in one sense be traced to the Berne Convention of 1906", partly as a result of lobbying by the International Association for Labour Legislation.

See also 
 London matchgirls strike of 1888

Notes

References 
 John Emsley, The Shocking History of Phosphorus: A Biography of the Devil's Element (2000) Macmillan Publishers, Ltd.: London, England

External links 

 The Berne Convention of 1906
 Information page, official depositary
 Review of book about phosphorus

Chemical industry
Occupational safety and health treaties
Treaties concluded in 1906
Treaties entered into force in 1912
History of Bern
Health treaties
1906 in Switzerland
Treaties of Argentina
Treaties extended to Australia
Treaties of the First Austrian Republic
Treaties of Belgium
Treaties of the Kingdom of Bulgaria
Treaties extended to Canada
Treaties of Chile
Treaties of the Republic of China (1912–1949)
Treaties of Cyprus
Treaties of Ivory Coast
Treaties of Denmark
Treaties of the Kingdom of Egypt
Treaties of Spain under the Restoration
Treaties of Estonia
Treaties of Fiji
Treaties of Finland
Treaties of the French Third Republic
Treaties of the Gambia
Treaties of the German Empire
Treaties of the Kingdom of Hungary (1920–1946)
Treaties extended to British India
Treaties of Pahlavi Iran
Treaties of the Irish Free State
Treaties of Israel
Treaties of the Kingdom of Italy (1861–1946)
Treaties of the Empire of Japan
Treaties of Luxembourg
Treaties of Madagascar
Treaties of Mali
Treaties of Malta
Treaties of Mauritius
Treaties of Mauritania
Treaties of Morocco
Treaties of Montenegro
Treaties of the Netherlands
Treaties extended to New Zealand
Treaties of Niger
Treaties of Norway
Treaties of the Second Polish Republic
Treaties of the Kingdom of Romania
Treaties of Senegal
Treaties of Serbia and Montenegro
Treaties extended to the Union of South Africa
Treaties of Sweden
Treaties of Switzerland
Treaties of Turkey
Treaties of Uganda
Treaties of the United Kingdom (1801–1922)
Treaties of the Kingdom of Yugoslavia
White phosphorus
Treaties extended to New Caledonia
Treaties extended to Réunion
Treaties extended to French Polynesia
Treaties extended to Wallis and Futuna
Treaties extended to Gibraltar
Treaties extended to Anguilla
Treaties extended to Montserrat
Treaties extended to the British Virgin Islands
Treaties extended to Greenland
Treaties extended to the Faroe Islands
Chemical safety